Aslauga guineensis, the Guinea aslauga, is a butterfly in the family Lycaenidae. It is found in Guinea.

References

External links
Images representing Aslauga guineensis at Barcodes of Life

Butterflies described in 1997
Aslauga
Endemic fauna of Guinea
Butterflies of Africa